Gregg Smith (born November 29, 1956) is a former Canadian sprint canoer who competed in the late 1970s. He won a silver medal in the C-2 500 m event at the 1977 ICF Canoe Sprint World Championships in Sofia.

Smith also finished seventh in the C-2 500 m event at the 1976 Summer Olympics in Montreal, Quebec, Canada.

References

1956 births
Canadian male canoeists
Canoeists at the 1976 Summer Olympics
Living people
Sportspeople from Brantford
Olympic canoeists of Canada
ICF Canoe Sprint World Championships medalists in Canadian